Narendra Rajya Lakshmi Devi (?–11 January 1775) was the Queen of Prithvi Narayan Shah, King of Kingdom of Nepal. She was the mother of King Pratap Singh Shah and Princes Vedum Shah and Bahadur Shah. She was the daughter of Abhiman Singh, a Rajput chief from Varanasi.

She committed sati on the same day that her husband, Late King Prithvi Narayan Shah, 's final rites were conducted.

References

Nepalese queens consort
1775 deaths
People of the Nepalese unification
Nepalese Hindus
18th-century Nepalese people
18th-century Nepalese nobility